Tom McHale may refer to:

 Tom McHale (novelist, born 1902) (1902–1994), American novelist from Iowa
 Tom McHale (novelist, born 1941) (1941–1982), American novelist from Pennsylvania
 Tom McHale (American football) (1963–2008), offensive guard
 Tommy McHale, English footballer for Bradford City